Arthur Sorin (born 1 November 1985) is a French footballer. He normally plays as a right-back, but can also play on the right side of midfield.

Career
Born in Laval, Mayenne, Sorin starting playing for Stade Rennais F.C. but had a hard time to gain a position in the first squad. After a loan period at Vannes OC he was sold to Kalmar FF.

In the summer of 2008, Danish Superliga side AGF Aarhus made a bid for Sorin, but Kalmar FF refused to let him go in mid season, so though he signed a deal with AGF in July 2008, he was not able to join the club before his contract with Kalmar expired in January 2009. His contract with AGF was suspended June 30. 2015.

Personal life
His younger brother Eliott Sorin is also a professional footballer, while his father Michel Sorin is a former footballer and the current head coach of AS Vitré.

Honours

Kalmar FF
 Allsvenskan: 2008
 Svenska Cupen: 2007

Individual
Sorin was selected as the second best Full back (and the best right back) in the Swedish league 2008, by the big Swedish football website svenskafans.com.

References

External links
AGF profile
Kalmar FF Profile
Profile at Frenchleague.com

Living people
1985 births
Association football fullbacks
Association football midfielders
French footballers
Vannes OC players
Kalmar FF players
CS Sedan Ardennes players
Aarhus Gymnastikforening players
Danish Superliga players
Allsvenskan players
Ligue 2 players
Championnat National players
Championnat National 2 players
French expatriate footballers
Expatriate footballers in Sweden
Expatriate men's footballers in Denmark
Sportspeople from Mayenne
Footballers from Pays de la Loire